The New Wave of Standup is a Canadian comedy web series, which premiered in 2020 on CBC Gem. The series features performance sets by 12 emerging Canadian comedians, recorded at the Vancouver edition of the Just for Laughs festival in February 2020.

Performers in the first season were Cassie Cao, Jacob Samuel, Al Val, Yumi Nagashima, Aaron Read, Salma Hindy, Kyle Brownrigg, Paul Rabliauskas, Brittany Lyseng, Ola Dada, Matty Vu and Brett Forte. A second season was released in 2022, featuring performances by Andrea Jin, Hisham Kelati, Allie Pearse, Nick Nemeroff, Abdul Aziz, Tin Lorica, Juliana Rodrigues, Maddy Kelly, Hoodo Hirsi, Steev Letts, Janelle Niles and Marito Lopez.

References

External links

2020 web series debuts
2020s Canadian comedy television series
Canadian comedy web series
CBC Gem original programming
Canadian stand-up comedy television series